The 2009 national road cycling championships began in January in Australia and New Zealand. Most of the European national championships took place in June.

Jerseys
The winner of each national championship wears the national jersey in all their races for the next year in the respective discipline, apart from the World Championships, or unless they are wearing a category leader's jersey in a stage race. The jerseys tend to represent the countries' flag or use the colours from it.

2009 Champions

With eight national champions, Team Columbia-HTC (1 road race champion and 7 time trial champions) had the most national champions in 2009.

Men's Elite

Women's

Men's Under-23

National road cycling championships by year